Sweet Home Central School District is a New York State public school district that serves the towns of Amherst and Tonawanda, New York of Erie County. The school district serves about 4,000 students in seven schools including one high school, one middle school, four elementary schools, and one alternative School.

Administration 
The District offices are located at 1901 Sweet Home Road in Amherst. The current Superintendent is Michael Ginestre.

Sweet Home High School 

Sweet Home High School is located at 1901 Sweet Home Road in Amherst and serves grades 9-12. The current principal is Antonio Perry.

History 
Sweet Home High School was built and opened in 1957.

Sweet Home Middle School 

Sweet Home Middle School is located at 4150 Maple Road and serves grades 6 through 8. The current principal is Derek Baker.

History 
Sweet Home Middle School was built in 1962 and opened in 1963.

Glendale Elementary School 

Glendale Elementary School is located at 101 Glendale Drive in Tonawanda and serves grades K through 5. The current principal is Joleen Dimitroff.

History 
Glendale Elementary was built in 1960 and opened in 1961.

Heritage Heights Elementary School 

Heritage Heights Elementary School is located at 2545 Sweet Home Road in Amherst and serves Grades K through 5. The current principal is Gregory Smorol.

History 
Heritage Heights Elementary was built in 1971. The school was originally constructed as an "open school", meaning that were no permanent walls dividing classrooms. Eventually, concrete walls would be installed into each room. Grade levels are divided into separate pods at different corners of the building.

In January 2014 Heritage Heights was up for closing because of being too expensive to run. After one Board of Education meeting in March 2014 it was decided that Heritage Heights would stay open on a 5 to 2 vote.

Maplemere Elementary School 

Maplemere Elementary School is located at 236 East Maplemere Road in Amherst and serves grades K through 5. The current principal is James Ryan.

History 
Maplemere Elementary was built and opened in 1961. The school was expanded in its Kindergarten to 3rd grade wing, and received another addition in 2003, which expanded the 4th and 5th grade wings plus the Library/Media Center.

Willow Ridge Elementary School 

Willow Ridge Elementary School is located at 480 Willow Ridge Road and serves Grades K through 5. The current principal is Robert Polino.

History 
Willow Ridge Elementary was built and opened in 1966.

Other

Dexter Terrace Alternative School (Built in 1959)

References

External links
 

School districts in New York (state)
Education in Erie County, New York